1,7-Bis(4-hydroxyphenyl)-1,4,6-heptatrien-3-one is a natural product, a curcuminoid antioxidant found in turmeric (Curcuma longa) and torch ginger (Etlingera elatior).

Structure and isolation
The all-trans double bond isomer (1E,4E,6E)-1,7-bis(4-hydroxyphenyl)-1,4,6-heptatrien-3-one was first fully characterised when isolated from extracts of the rhizomes of turmeric (Curcuma longa) in 1993. It has subsequently been found in other species, including etlingera elatior.
A very large number of similar compounds are found in turmeric and ginger. These have been extensively studied in their roles as antioxidants and for their potential pharmacological properties.

The (1Z) double bond isomer is poorly characterised in the literature and it and the compounds with unspecified stereochemistry may in fact be the parent all-E molecule.

Properties 
Mohamad et al. (2005) found that the curcuminoids 1,7-bis(4-hydroxyphenyl)-1,4,6-heptatrien-3-one, demethoxycurcumin, and 16-hydroxylabda-8(17),11,13-trien-15,16-olide inhibit lipid peroxidation more potently than does alpha-tocopherol.

See also 
 Diarylheptanoid

References

Further reading

Curcuminoids
Phenol antioxidants
Vinylogous carboxylic acids